The 8th Congress of the Workers' Party of Korea was held at the April 25 House of Culture in Pyongyang from 5 to 12 January 2021. A total of 7,000 people participated in the congress including 5,000 delegates. The Party Congress took place in the midst of the COVID-19 pandemic where no cases were reported.

Preparations 
Hints of an upcoming 8th WPK Congress first emerged during the 13th Political Bureau meeting of the 7th WPK Central Committee held on 7 June 2020. The meeting mentioned a drafting of an amendment of the WPK Charter, which can only be approved through either a party congress or a party conference.

The congress was announced through a decision issued at the 6th plenary meeting of the 7th WPK Central Committee on 19 August 2020. Among the congress agendas are the review of the work of the WPK Central Committee, the review of the work of the Central Auditing Commission, the revision of the WPK Charter and the election of the central leadership organ.

WPK Chairman Kim Jong-un also revealed during the plenary meeting that a new five-year economic development plan is going to be presented at the congress after mentioning that the current five-year economic development plan has fallen far short of its objectives.

Ahead of the party congress, an 80-day mass mobilization campaign was announced at the 19th Political Bureau meeting of the 7th WPK Central Committee on 5 October 2020. The campaign took place from 12 October until 30 December 2020.

On 29 November 2020, the 21st enlarged Political Bureau meeting of the 7th WPK Central Committee was held which discussed preparatory work for the party congress, which included the preparations for the election of delegates to the party congress, the documents for the party congress and the political and cultural events to be held during the party congress. According to analysts, there will likely be a military and civilian parade sometime during the congress.

The Political Bureau of the 7th WPK Central Committee decided during its 22nd meeting on 29 December 2020 that the party congress is to be convened in early January 2021. A separate report from the Korean Central News Agency on 30 December confirmed that the party congress is to be held in Pyongyang.

Delegates 
Delegates to the 8th WPK Congress were elected in conferences of provincial party committees and other party organizations in December 2020. They were elected on the basis of one delegate with voting rights for every 1,300 party members and one delegate with speaking rights for every 1,300 candidate party members. Elected party congress delegates arrived in Pyongyang in late December 2020.

The qualifications of party congress delegates were evaluated and approved by the 22nd Political Bureau meeting of the 7th WPK Central Committee on 29 December 2020. The meeting also decided on the members of the party congress' presidium, platform members and secretariat.

A ceremony for awarding certificates to party congress delegates was held on 30 December 2020. Kim Il-sung and Kim Jong-il were posthumously declared to be delegates to the party congress.

There was a total of 5,000 delegates to the 8th WPK Congress. Of the 5,000 delegates, 250 were members of the 7th WPK Central Committee and 4,750 delegates were elected by party conferences to represent an estimated 6,175,000 party members and candidate members.

501 delegates were women, which is an increase of 186 from the 315 women delegates in the 7th Congress. There were also 2,000 observers, which is an increase of 613 from 1,387 observers in the 7th Congress.

Korean Social Democratic Party chairman Pak Yong-il, Chondoist Chongu Party chairman Ri Myong-chol, and Anti-Imperialist National Democratic Front Pyongyang mission chief Pak Su-chol were invited to attend the congress.

The following delegates were elected as members of the party congress' presidium:

Kim Jong-un, Choe Ryong-hae, Ri Pyong-chol, Kim Tok-hun, Pak Pong-ju, Pak Jong-chon, Kim Jae-ryong, Ri Il-hwan, Choe Hwi, Pak Thae-dok, Kim Yong-chol, Choe Pu-il, Kim Su-gil, Thae Hyong-chol, O Su-yong, Kim Hyong-jun, Ho Chol-man, Pak Myong-sun, Jo Yong-won, Kim Yo-jong, Pak Jong-nam, Yang Sung-ho, Ri Ju-o, Tong Jong-ho, Ko In-ho, Kim Hyong-sik, Choe Sang-gon, O Il-jong, Kim Yong-su, Ri Sang-won, Ri Yong-gil, Kim Myong-gil, Kang Yun-sok

The following delegates were elected as members of the party congress' secretariat:

Sin Ryong Man, Ham Ryong Chol, So Kyong Nam, Kim Pong Chol, Kang Jong Gwan, Kim Jong Min, Ri Hyong Jin

Agenda of the Congress 
The general agenda for the 8th Party Congress were as follows:

 Review on the activities of the outgoing 7th Central Committee
 Review on the activities of the 7th Central Auditing Commission
 Amendments to the Rules
 Election of Kim Jong-un as leader of the Party in the title of General Secretary
 Election of the incoming 8th Central Committee and the party departments under the CC

References

External links 
 

Politics of North Korea
2021 in North Korea
2021 conferences
Congresses of the Workers' Party of Korea